André Neal Vos (born 9 January 1975) is a former South African rugby union player who played as a loose forward for Eastern Province (South Africa), Queensland Reds (Australia), The Cats, The Lions and Harlequins (England) until his retirement in 2007.

He also captained the Springboks.

Vos attended Selborne College in East London, South Africa (he represented Border at the 1992 Craven Week) and the then University of Port Elizabeth.

He represented South Africa at the U21 and at under 23 level.

He made his senior provincial debut for Eastern Province (then coached by Alex Wyllie) in 1995, and played 35 matches for that province in 1995 and 1996.

He played for the Golden Lions in 1997.

In 1998 he wore the Queensland Reds' jersey in the Super 12 earning 11 full caps for the Australian franchise.

He returned to South African shores in 1998 to play for the Cats in the Super 12 and for the Golden Lions in the South African Currie Cup.

He made his international debut against Italy in Port Elizabeth on 12 June 1999 as a replacement. The final score was 74-3 in favour of the Springboks.
He was in the starting 15 for the next match in Durban.  He was in and out of the starting 15 for the next eight test matches, starting in only three.

After the IRB Rugby World Cup in 1999 he took over the captaincy of South Africa from Joost van der Westhuizen.

He went on to earn 33 test caps for South Africa (6 as substitute), 16 as captain. He scored 5 tries for South Africa. His international career record is: played 33, won 18, drew 1, lost 14.

Vos retired from international rugby in 2002, saying, "Physically I am no longer up to Springbok rugby."

He captained the Harlequins for three years until he resigned at the end of the 2005/6 season, when Paul Volley took over.

He was able to obtain a free transfer to England, as his English-born wife Caroline holds a British passport.

References

External links 
Statistics at Barbarianfc.co.uk
 

1975 births
Living people
Alumni of Selborne College
Barbarian F.C. players
Expatriate rugby union players in Australia
Expatriate rugby union players in England
Golden Lions players
Harlequin F.C. players
Lions (United Rugby Championship) players
Nelson Mandela University alumni
Queensland Reds players
Rugby union players from East London, Eastern Cape
South Africa international rugby union players
South African expatriate rugby union players
South African expatriate sportspeople in Australia
South African expatriate sportspeople in England
South African rugby union players
White South African people
Rugby union number eights